María Isidra de Guzmán y de la Cerda (October 31, 1767 – March 5, 1803) was a Spanish noble and scholar. She is regarded to be the first woman to receive a Doctor of Philosophy in Spain.

Life
She was the daughter of Diego Ventura de Guzmán y Fernández de Córdoba, 7th Marquis de Montealegre, 13th Count of Onate and María Isidra de la Cerda, 14th Duchess of Najera, Grandee of Spain. She was given an unusually good education and described as the child prodigy of the king.

She was given special royal dispensation from Charles III of Spain to study at the humanistic and literary faculty of the University of Alcalá, where she graduated in 1785 as a Doctor of Philosophy. She was named honorary professor of philosophy at the university and called Doctora de Alcala.

She was elected an honorary member of the Real Academia de la Historia and Real Academia Española, the first female member of the Real Sociedad Económica Matritense de Amigos del País (1784), and decorated with the Junta de Damas Nobles de Honor y Mérito and the Orden de damas nobles de María Luisa.

In 1787, she translated Columella from Latin.

In 1789, she married Alfonso de Sousa, 12th Marquis of Guadalcázar, Grandee of Spain.

See also
 María Pascuala Caro Sureda

References 
 Theresa Ann Smit: The Emerging Female Citizen: Gender and Enlightenment in Spain
 Romà de la Calle: La Real Academia de Bellas Artes de San Carlos en la Valencia ilustrada
 Robert A. C. Richards: Living & Working in Spain: How to Prepare for a Successful Stay, be it Short
 Katharina M. Wilson: [An Encyclopedia of Continental Women Writers, Volym 1]
 http://dbe.rah.es/biografias/22681/maria-isidra-de-guzman-y-de-la-cerda

1767 births
1803 deaths
18th-century Spanish people